The Water Lily Shaft near Eureka, Utah was dug during 31 days in 1921 and won a "World Champion Shaft Sinking" competition.  It was drilled by Walter Fitch Jr. Company using Waugh Clipper Drills, and set a record of "427.5 feet of vertical, three-compartment shaft" being dug in a 31-day period.

It was listed on the National Register of Historic Places in 1979 and is in the Tintic Mining District.

References

Industrial buildings and structures on the National Register of Historic Places in Utah
Buildings and structures in Utah County, Utah
Mining in Utah
National Register of Historic Places in Utah County, Utah